Cooloolabin is a rural locality in the Sunshine Coast Region, Queensland, Australia. In the  Cooloolabin had a population of 257 people.

Geography 
Most of Cooloolabin is mountainous, densely forested and within the Mapleton National Park, including Mount Bottle and Glass (230 metres) and Swain Peak (280 metres). Only two small valleys to the south are developed as rural residential areas.

History 
Cooloolabin is an Aboriginal word meaning "place of koalas".

Cooloolabin Provisional School opened in 1915. It became Cooloolabin State School on 1 September 1916. It closed in 1962.

In the  Cooloolabin had a population of 257 people.

References

Further reading 

 
 

Suburbs of the Sunshine Coast Region
Localities in Queensland